George Edmonds may refer to:

George Edmonds (footballer) (1893–1989), association footballer for Watford and Wolverhampton Wanderers
George W. Edmonds (1864–1939), U.S. Representative from Pennsylvania
George Edmonds (lawyer) (1788–1868), English teacher, lawyer, and scholar

See also
George F. Edmunds (1828–1919), Republican senator from Vermont
George Edmands Merrill (1846–1908), American Baptist clergyman and educator